Bulbine crassa, the coast lily or Crassa Island leek lily, is a flower described in 2006 which occurs on the Furneaux Group of islands between Victoria and Tasmania. Seeds have been preserved as part of the Tasmanian partnership with the Millennium Seed Bank Project.

References

crassa
Flora of Tasmania
Plants described in 2006
Taxa named by Marco Duretto